Jain University, officially JAIN (Deemed-to-be University), is a private deemed-to-be-university in Bangalore, India. Originating from Sri Bhagawan Mahaveer Jain College, it was conferred the deemed-to-be-university status in 2009. In August 2019 Jain University opened its off campus in Kochi, Kerala.

History
Jain University originates from Sri Bhagawan Mahaveer Jain College (SBMJC), established by the founder and chairman of JGI GROUP, Dr.Chenraj Roychand in 1990. It was conferred deemed to be university status in 2009.

Constituent colleges and centres
Jain (Deemed-to-be University) includes the following colleges and centers, all in Bangalore, unless otherwise noted:

 CMS Business school
 Center for Management Studies
 Center for Post Graduate Studies
 Center for Distance Education and Virtual Learning
 Centre for Research in Social Science and Education
 Centre for Nano and Material Sciences
 Centre for Research in Pure and Applied Sciences
 Centre for Disaster Mitigation
 Centre for Ancient Indian History & Culture
 Centre for Indian Psychology
 Centre for Advanced Studies in Biosciences
 Chenraj Roychand Centre for Entrepreneurship
 International Institute for Aerospace Engineering and Management
 School of Allied Healthcare and Sciences
 School of Commerce Studies
 School Of Sciences
 School of Engineering and Technology - Jain University (also known as Faculty of Engineering and Technology)
 Centre for Creative Arts and Design
 Center for Distance Education and Virtual Learning

Academics

Academic programmes 
Jain University offers more than 200 UG and PG programs in commerce, sciences, humanities and arts, engineering and technology and management. It also offers courses for working professionals in the field of Business Administration, Engineering and Information technology.

Accreditations and rankings

The National Institutional Ranking Framework (NIRF) ranked the institution 79 among universities and 101-150 overall in 2020. It also ranked it 117 among engineering colleges and 86 among business schools. Outlook India ranked it 68 among universities.

Student life
Jain (Deemed-to-be University) campus housing system can accommodate nearly 85 percent of the student population.

Hostel accommodation
Jain (Deemed-to-be University) offers both on-campus (JGI Global Campus) and off-campus accommodations in different locations in Bangalore. For most of their hostel accommodation they have a contact with a company called Campus Students Communities(CSC). The residential arrangements are separate for the sexes. Jain (Deemed-to-be University) accommodations are managed by the Hostel Management Division.

Notable alumni
 Anup Sridhar -  Badminton
 Ann Augustine - Actress
 Aditi Ashok - Golfer
 Bindu Subramaniam -  Singer-lyricist and pianist
 Diganth – Actor
 Gagan Ullalmath -  Swimmer
 Gaurav Dhiman - Cricketer
 H. S. Sharath - Cricketer
 Jagadeesha Suchith - Cricketer
 K. L. Rahul - Cricketer
 Karun Nair - Cricketer
 Kaunain Abbas - Cricketer
 Kriti Kharbanda - Actress
 Nighat Chaudhry - Kathak Dancer
 Mayank Agarwal - Cricketer
 Niranjan Mukundan - Paralympic swimmer
 Pankaj Advani -  Billiards player
 Prajwal Devaraj -  Actor
 Prasidh Krishna - Cricketer
 Rakesh Manpat - Shooter
 Ravikumar Samarth - Cricketer
 Rohan Bopanna - Tennis player
 Robin Uthappa - Cricketer
 Rohit Havaldar - Swimmer
 Sharath Gayakwad - Paralympic swimmer
 Shreyas Gopal - Cricketer
 Srinidhi Shetty - Model/Actress
 Samyuktha Hegde - Actress
 Varun Aaron - Cricketer
 Abhinav Manohar - Cricketer 
 C A Karthik - Cricketer 
 Trishul Chinappa - Golfer

See also 
 List of deemed universities
 List of institutions of higher education in Karnataka
 Bangalore

References

External links

Jain (Deemed-to-be University)
Jain University Kochi 
Jain School of Law and Governance
(Jain University Online)

Universities in Bangalore
Deemed universities in Karnataka
Educational institutions established in 1990
Jain universities and colleges
1990 establishments in Karnataka